Association Sportive Montferrandaise Clermont Auvergne is a French rugby union club from Clermont-Ferrand in Auvergne-Rhône-Alpes that currently competes in Top 14, the top level of the French league system. Clermont are two times French champions in 2009-10 and 2016-17. The rugby section is a part of a multi-sport club called AS Montferrand (also known as ASM Omnisports), which was founded in 1911 and adopted that name in 1919. Although the rugby section changed its name to the current ASM Clermont Auvergne in 2004, it is still frequently referred to as Montferrand both within and outside France.

The team play at the 19,022-seat Stade Marcel-Michelin, also known by its nickname, The Bib Park. Clermont wear yellow and blue, the colours of the French tyre manufacturer Michelin, taken from the colours of Montferrand when the firm was created there in 1889.

The city is where Marcel Michelin, the son of the founder of the French tyre manufacturer, decided to implement the first factory but also the stadium after the creation of ASM for its workers before World War I. L'ASM, as they are also called, have reached the French Championship final thirteen times, losing on each occasion until their eleventh trip in 2010, when they won the championship in their 100th year as a club.

History

Amateur era
The club was established in 1911 as AS Michelin, though they changed their name to AS Montferrandaise in 1919 due to legal obligation. The club was started by Marcel Michelin, the son of André Michelin, the founder of the Michelin tyre manufacturer. He died in deportation at Buchenwald; he had been deported there as a member of the Resistance and was involved in two successful escape attempts before dying during the third.

The club made its first final of any competition in 1935, where they played Perpignan for the Challenge Yves du Manoir. AS Montferrand lost the match, 3–3 and 9–0. The following year they featured in their first championship final; though they lost to RC Narbonne 6 points to 3. They made the final again in 1937, though that match was also lost, 13 points to 7 to CS Vienne. The following season the club won its first title; winning the Challenge Yves du Manoir by defeating Perpignan 23 points to 10.

During the 1940s the club contested the Coupe de France on two occasions, in 1945 and 1947. The club lost on both occasions, by one point, 14 to 13 to SU Agen in 1945, and then 14 to 11 against Toulouse in 1947. It would be another 10 years until the club featured in another competition final; losing to US Dax in the 1957 Challenge Yves du Manoir. The club became a force during the 1970s, starting in 1970 with a 3 points to nil championship loss to La Voulte Sportif. The club then contested the Challenge Yves du Manoir twice in a row over the 1972–73 seasons; losing both finals, against AS Béziers and Narbonne respectively. Then they won the competition in 1976, defeating SC Graulhet 40 points to 12 just a few days after the death of the young international winger, Jean-François Philiponeau, struck on the field during an exhibition game. The club then contested the championship final in 1978, though they lost to Béziers. They also lost the Challenge Yves du Manoir in 1979, against Narbonne.

In 1994 season the club contested both the French championship and the Challenge Yves du Manoir. They lost the Challenge Yves du Manoir to Perpignan (the third time the clubs had met in the competition final). They also lost the championship, defeated 22 points to 16 by Toulouse.

Professional era

The club contested two finals in the 1999 season as well, the French championship and the European Challenge Cup. They won the European Challenge Cup, defeating fellow French club CS Bourgoin-Jallieu 35 points to 16 at the Stade Gerland in Lyon. However they lost the domestic final, being defeated by Toulouse again, 15 points to 11. The club would meet Toulouse again in the season final of 2001, with Toulouse winning 34 points to 22. In 2004 they contested the European Challenge Cup again, though they lost to English club Harlequins, by one point, 27 to 26 at the last minute.

The team experienced a hard period between 2002 and 2006 and it was only with the arrival of Vern Cotter, in the middle of 2006, that the team's form began to improve. In Vern Cotter's first year as head coach, Clermont reached their first final since 2001 (which they lost in the last minute against Stade Français), and won the European Challenge Cup against Bath at the Twickenham Stoop.
Montferrand developed further under Vern Cotter during the following two seasons, but they lose two more finals against Toulouse in 2008, and Perpignan in 2009. But the team continues to bounce back and perform well years of years.

In 2010, in the Heineken Cup the team was drawn against Leicester Tigers and Ospreys in a tough pool. Despite this Montferrand succeeded in winning the pool and were subsequently drawn against the holders of the cup, Leinster Rugby. That was the beginning of what would become one of the greatest rivalries in rugby. In an epic battle, Montferrand lost 29–28. After this loss, they went on to win all of their remaining games to win the French championship against Perpignan (19–6) with a notably exceptional display during the semi-final against RC Toulon in Saint-Etienne.

In 2012 they reached the semi-final of the Heineken Cup. They were beaten by Leinster Rugby and were inches from winning the game at the end but Wesley Fofana dropped the ball on Leinster's try line.

Clermont reached the Heineken Cup final for the first time in 2013 after they beat Munster Rugby 16–10 in the semi-final in Montpellier. They subsequently lost to Toulon in the HEC final which was held in Lansdowne Road in Dublin on 18 May 2013 by a single point (16–15).

In 2014, Clermont reached the Heineken Cup semi-final of the play-offs for the second consecutive time and lost to Saracens.

2015 saw Clermont make it to the final of the European Cup (now European Rugby Champions Cup) but lost to RC Toulon 24–18. A few weeks later, they also lost the final of the French Top 14 against Stade Français 12–6.

2016 saw Clermont having their first blow in the European Rugby Champions Cup since 2011 by failing to make the quarter final after a late loss against Bordeaux at home. But they finally reached the French championship semi-final with a highly controversial lose against Racing 92.

However, the team bounced back and produced during the season 2016-2017, reaching again two finals in the French Top 14 and European Champions Cup. They lost the European Cup against reigning champions Saracens.

In January 2020, Clermont acquired a minority stake in the American rugby club New Orleans Gold. In addition to player exchanges, the teams will seek to facilitate cultural exchanges between the state of Louisiana and France.

Current standings

Honours 

 European Rugby Champions Cup:
 Runners-up: 3 (2013, 2015, 2017)
 European Rugby Challenge Cup:
 Winners: 3 (1999, 2007, 2019)
 Runners-up: 1 (2004)
 Top 14:
 Winners: 2 (2010, 2017)
 Runners-up: 12 (1936, 1937, 1970, 1978, 1994, 1999, 2001, 2007, 2008, 2009, 2015, 2019)
 Challenge Yves du Manoir:
 Winners: 3 (1938, 1976, 1986)
 Runners-up: 6 (1935, 1957, 1972, 1979, 1985, 1994)
 Coupe de France:
 Winners: 1 (2001)
 Runners-up: 2 (1945, 1947)

European results

Heineken Cup and European Rugby Champions Cup Finals

European Challenge Cup Finals

France results

French championship

Challenge Yves du Manoir 

* Note: by virtue of younger players

Coupe de France

Current squad 

The Clermont squad for the 2022–23 season is:

Espoirs squad

The ASM Clermont Auvergne Espoirs squad is:

Notable former players 

 
  Alejandro Campos
  Agustín Creevy
  Mario Ledesma
  Gonzalo Longo
  Martín Scelzo
  Hernán Senillosa
  Peter Betham
  Pat Howard
  Brock James
  Sitaleki Timani
  John Ulugia
  Jamie Cudmore
  Cameron Pierce
  Jan Macháček
  Nick Abendanon
  Brian Ashton
  Richard Cockerill
  Rory Jennings
  Alex King
  David Strettle
  Seremaia Bai
  Vilimoni Delasau
  Kini Murimurivalu
  Napolioni Nalaga
  David Attoub
  Alexandre Audebert
  Olivier Azam
  Franck Azéma
  Benoît Baby
  Julien Bonnaire
  David Bory
  Michel Boucheron
  Olivier Brouzet
  Jean-Marcellin Buttin
  Benoit Cabello
  Charlie Cassang
  Stéphane Castaignède
  Raphaël Chanal
  Raphaël Chaume
  Damien Chouly
  Arnaud Costes
  Franck Comba
  Vincent Debaty
  Thomas Domingo
  Michel Droitecourt
  André Dubertrand
  Laurent Emmanuelli
  Sipili Falatea
  Lionel Faure
  Anthony Floch
  Alessio Galasso
  Camille Gerondeau
  Loann Goujon
  Kevin Gourdon
  Rémy Grosso
  Loïc Jacquet
  Christophe Juillet
  Benjamin Kayser
  Daniel Kotze
  Thierry Lacrampe
  Rémi Lamerat
  Jean-Marc Lhermet
  Camille Lopez
  Olivier Magne
  Julien Malzieu
  Jimmy Marlu
  Philippe Marocco
  Tony Marsh
  Gérald Merceron
  Olivier Merle
  Geoffroy Messina
  Arnaud Mignardi
  Pierre Mignoni
  Noa Nakaitaci
  Laurent Pardo
  Morgan Parra
  Alexandre Péclier
  Julien Pierre
  Adrien Planté
  Lucas Pointud
  Bastien Pourailly
  Thibaut Privat
  Louis Puech
  Ludovic Radosavljevic
  Clément Ric
  Jean-Pierre Romeu
  Laurent Rodriguez
  Aurélien Rougerie
  Jacques Rougerie
  Philippe Saint-André
  Christophe Samson
  Enzo Sanga
  Atila Septar
  David Skrela
  Cédric Soulette
  Scott Spedding
  Jérôme Thion
  Romain Taofifenua
  Elvis Vermeulen
  Sébastien Viars
  Pierre Vigouroux
  Tani Vili
  Otar Giorgadze
  Beka Kakabadze
  Viktor Kolelishvili
  Goderdzi Shvelidze
  Davit Zirakashvili
  Gonzalo Canale
  Alessandro Troncon
  Kotaro Matsushima
  Sam Broomhall
  Mike Delany
  Zac Guildford
  Joe Karam
  Regan King
  Sione Lauaki
  Kevin Senio
  Sitiveni Sivivatu
  Benson Stanley
  Isaia Toeava
  Julien Bardy
  Taylor Gontineac
  Tasesa Lavea
  Tim Nanai-Williams
  Ti'i Paulo
  George Pisi
  John Senio
  Gavin Williams
  Paul Burnell
  Greig Laidlaw
  Jason White
  Nathan Hines
  Selborne Boome
  Marius Joubert
  Breyton Paulse
  Brent Russell
  John Smit
  Gerhard Vosloo
  Pierre-Emmanuel Garcia
  Seti Kiole
  Johnny Ngauamo
  Kevin Dalzell
  Jonathan Davies
  Stephen Jones
  Lee Byrne

See also 
 List of rugby union clubs in France
 Rugby union in France

References

External links 
  ASM Clermont Auvergne Official website
  ASM Rugby supporters club web site

 
Clermont
Clermont
Sport in Clermont-Ferrand
1911 establishments in France